Baron de Ros of Helmsley is the premier baron in the Peerage of England, created in 1288/89 for William de Ros, with precedence to 24 December 1264. (The spelling of the title and of the surname of the original holders has been rendered differently in various texts. The word "Ros" is sometimes spelt "Roos", and the word "de" is sometimes dropped.) Premier baron is a designation and status awarded to the holder of the most ancient extant barony of the Peerage of England. Before the Dissolution of the Monasteries the Prior of the Order of St John in England was deemed the premier baron.

Ancientness and precedence 
On 24 December 1264 Robert de Ros (died 1285) was summoned to Simon de Montfort's Parliament in London, and for some time it was considered that the barony was created by writ in that year, giving it precedence over all other English titles unless certain doubtful contentions concerning the title of the Earl of Arundel were accepted. The only older peerage titles in the British Isles are: Baron Kerry and Lixnaw (1181, held by the Marquess of Lansdowne), Baron Offaly (1199, later creation held by the Duke of Leinster), and Baron Kingsale (c. 1223) in the Peerage of Ireland, and Earl of Mar (predates 1115) and Earl of Sutherland (1230) in the Peerage of Scotland.

According to The Complete Peerage:

Style
Whenever a man holds the title, he is considered the premier baron of England. However, whenever a woman holds the title, the holder of the next-highest barony held by a man is known as the premier baron. For instance, when Georgiana Maxwell, the most recent female to hold the title, was baroness, the Baron Mowbray, Segrave, and Stourton was considered the premier baron.

Remainder 
The Barony may pass to heirs-general rather than just heirs-male, unlike most British titles. The barony may pass to daughters only if there are no sons. Under inheritance law, sisters have an equal right to inherit; there is no special inheritance right due for the eldest sister, as there is for the eldest son. Thus, it is possible that two or more sisters (and their heirs after their deaths) have an equally valid claim to the title; in such a case, the title goes into abeyance. The abeyance ends either when there is only one remaining claimant due to the deaths of the other claimants, or when the Sovereign "terminates" the abeyance in favour of one of the heirs. The peerage has been held by a woman six times, more than any other peerage except that of Baron Willoughby de Eresby.

Descent 

The title was originally held by the de Ros family until the death of the tenth Baron in 1508, when it was inherited by his nephew, the 11th Baron. His son, Thomas, inherited the barony and was later created Earl of Rutland. The barony and earldom remained united until the death of the third Earl, Edward Manners. The barony was then inherited by his only daughter, Elizabeth Cecil, while the earldom passed to a male heir, his younger brother. Upon the death of Elizabeth's only son, William Cecil, the title returned to the Manners family, being inherited by the sixth Earl of Rutland.

Again, upon the sixth Earl's death, the barony and earldom were separated (the earldom being inherited by a distant cousin, the great-nephew of the 2nd earl), as the barony was inherited by the Earl's daughter Katherine, who had married George Villiers, 1st Duke of Buckingham. Katherine's son George inherited both the barony and the dukedom, but upon his death the dukedom became extinct and the barony went into abeyance.

The barony had been in abeyance for over a century when Charlotte Boyle-Walsingham who was later to marry Lord Henry FitzGerald, a son of the 4th Duke of Leinster) petitioned King George III to terminate the abeyance in her favour in 1790. (She was the daughter of Robert Boyle-Walsingham by his wife Charlotte, daughter of Sir Charles Hanbury Williams by his wife Frances, daughter of Thomas Coningsby, 1st Earl Coningsby by his wife Frances, daughter of Richard Jones, 1st Earl of Ranelagh by his wife Elizabeth, daughter of Francis Willoughby, 5th Baron Willoughby of Parham, son of William Willoughby, 3rd Baron Willoughby of Parham by his wife Frances, daughter of John Manners, 4th Earl of Rutland who was a younger brother of the 14th Baron de Ros.) The King referred the matter to the House of Lords, which recommended that the barony remain in abeyance. However, in 1806, George III terminated the abeyance in her favour on the recommendation of his Prime Minister. Charlotte and her heirs then took the additional surname of "de Ros" after "FitzGerald".

The title eventually went into abeyance again upon the death of the 25th Baroness, in 1939. The abeyance was terminated in favour of her eldest daughter, Lady Una Mary Ross (née Dawson) in 1943, and again went into abeyance upon her death in 1956. Two years later, the barony was called out of abeyance again for Una Ross's granddaughter, Georgiana Maxwell (née Ross).  the title is held by her son the 27th Baron, the first man to hold the title in over three-quarters of a century, who succeeded his mother in 1983.

The family seat is Old Court, near Strangford, County Down.

Barons Ros of Helmsley (1264)
William Ros, 1st Baron Ros (d. 1317)
William Ros, 2nd Baron Ros (d. 1343)
William Ros, 3rd Baron Ros (c. 1326–1352)
Thomas Ros, 4th Baron Ros (1336–1384)
John Ros, 5th Baron Ros (c. 1360–1394)
William de Ros, 6th Baron Ros (c. 1369–1414)
John Ros, 7th Baron Ros (d. 1421)
Thomas Ros, 8th Baron Ros (c. 1405–1431)
Thomas Ros, 9th Baron Ros (c. 1427–1464) (forfeit 1464)
Edmund Ros, 10th Baron Ros (d. 1508) (restored 1485, barony abeyant in 1508)
George Manners, 11th Baron Ros (d. 1513) (abeyance terminated about 1512)
Thomas Manners, 1st Earl of Rutland, 12th Baron Ros (d. 1543)
Henry Manners, 2nd Earl of Rutland, 13th Baron Ros (1526–1563)
Edward Manners, 3rd Earl of Rutland, 14th Baron Ros (1549–1587)
Elizabeth Cecil, 15th Baroness Ros (c. 1572–1591)
William Cecil, 16th Baron Ros (1590–1618)
Francis Manners, 6th Earl of Rutland, 17th Baron Ros (1578–1632)
Katherine Villiers, Duchess of Buckingham, 18th Baroness Ros (d. 1649)
George Villiers, 2nd Duke of Buckingham, 19th Baron Ros (1628–1687) (barony abeyant 1687)
Charlotte FitzGerald-de Ros, 20th Baroness de Ros (1769–1831) (abeyance terminated 1806), first to be styled "de Ros"
Henry FitzGerald-de Ros, 21st Baron de Ros (1793–1839)
William FitzGerald-de Ros, 22nd Baron de Ros (1797–1874)
Dudley FitzGerald-de Ros, 23rd Baron de Ros (1827–1907)   
Mary Dawson, Countess of Dartrey, 24th Baroness de Ros (1854–1939) (abeyant 1939)
Una Ross, 25th Baroness de Ros (1879–1956) (abeyance terminated 1943; abeyant 1956)
Georgiana Maxwell, 26th Baroness de Ros (1933–1983) (abeyance terminated 1958)
Peter Maxwell, 27th Baron de Ros (b. 1958)

The heir apparent is the present holder's son, the Hon. Finbar James Maxwell (b. 1988).

Arms

Footnotes

References

 

 
1264 establishments in England
Baronies in the Peerage of England
Baronies by writ
Noble titles created in 1264